FC Strogino Moscow is a Russian professional football club based in Moscow. It started its professional history in the 2013–14 season of the Russian Professional Football League.  FC Strogino's Yantar (Amber) Stadium was the preparation base for the Russian Student's Team before the 2017 Summer Universiade.

Current squad
As of 21 February 2023, according to the Second League website.

Out on loan

References

External links
  Official website

Football clubs in Moscow
Association football clubs established in 2010
Football in Moscow Oblast
2010 establishments in Russia